Nadiya Baranova (born 5 July 1983) is a former Ukrainian football goalkeeper.

Honours
Zvezda-2005 Perm
 Top Division: 2007, 2008, 2009
 Russian Women's Cup: 2007, 2012

Lehenda Chernihiv 
 Ukrainian Women's League: 2000, 2001, 2002, 2005, 
 Women's Cup: 2001, 2002, 2005,

References

External links 
 
 Footballer Nadiya Baranova: No one leaves home out of good life (Футболістка Надія Баранова: Від гарного життя з дому б ніхто не їхав). Svoboda.FM. 12 May 2009.

1983 births
Living people
Footballers from Chernihiv
Ukrainian women's footballers
Ukraine women's international footballers
Expatriate women's footballers in Russia
Ukrainian expatriate women's footballers
Women's association football goalkeepers
WFC Lehenda-ShVSM Chernihiv players
Zvezda 2005 Perm players
Ukrainian expatriate sportspeople in Russia